Abilio James Acosta (born April 17, 1971) is an American broadcast journalist, anchor and the chief domestic correspondent for CNN. Previously, Acosta served as the network's chief White House correspondent during the Trump administration, in which he gained national attention for President Donald Trump's clashes with him at press briefings. Acosta also covered the Obama administration as CNN's senior White House correspondent. As Trump was about to leave office, it was announced on January 11, 2021 that Acosta had been appointed Anchor and Chief Domestic Correspondent for CNN.

Early life and education
Acosta's father arrived in the U.S. at age 11 as a refugee from Cuba three weeks before the Cuban Missile Crisis and was raised in Virginia. His mother is of Irish and Czech ancestry. Acosta, also raised in Northern Virginia, graduated from Annandale High School in 1989. In 1993, he earned a bachelor's degree in mass communication, with a minor in political science, from James Madison University. While in school, Acosta volunteered for WXJM, the student-run radio station. He also worked as a reporter at WSVA, a local radio station, which is owned and operated by Saga Communications.

Media career

Acosta began his professional career in radio, and his first job was with WMAL in Washington, D.C. In 1994, Acosta left WMAL and entered television, working for Fox affiliate WTTG-TV as a desk assistant. In 1995, Acosta moved in front of the camera, becoming a reporter and substitute anchor at NBC affiliate WBIR-TV in Knoxville, Tennessee, and remained in that job until 1998.

From 1998 until 2000, Acosta worked as a reporter for CBS affiliate KTVT-TV in Dallas. From 2000 until 2001, Acosta was a reporter for WBBM-TV in Chicago. From 2001 until 2003, Acosta worked as a correspondent for CBS News' Newspath service, based both in Dallas and Chicago. From February 2003 until March 2007, Acosta was a correspondent for CBS News and was based first in New York and then in Atlanta.

At CBS News, Acosta covered the 2004 campaign of Democratic presidential candidate John Kerry, the Iraq War from Baghdad, and Hurricane Katrina. In April 2007, Acosta joined CNN. During the following year, Acosta covered the 2008 presidential campaigns of Democratic candidates Barack Obama and Hillary Clinton, frequently appearing as an anchor of CNN's weekend political program, Ballot Bowl. Acosta later joined CNN's American Morning program as a correspondent and contributed to the network's coverage of the 2010 midterm elections.

In February 2012, CNN promoted Acosta to the position of national political correspondent. In his role as national political correspondent, Acosta was the network's lead correspondent in covering the 2012 presidential campaign of Republican nominee Mitt Romney. He was then the senior White House correspondent for CNN. At a nationally televised news conference in November 2015, Acosta challenged President Obama on his administration's strategy for destroying the terrorist organization known as ISIS. "Why can't we take out these bastards," Acosta asked.

Acosta traveled to Cuba in March 2016 to cover President Obama's historic trip to the island. At a rare news conference in Havana featuring both Obama and Cuban president Raúl Castro, Acosta pressed the Cuban leader on his country's human rights record.

Acosta was promoted to chief White House correspondent on January 9, 2018.

In January 2021, CNN announced that Acosta would move to chief domestic correspondent and weekend anchor. The moves aligned with the incoming Biden administration.

President Trump press conferences

At a nationally televised news conference in May 2016, Republican presidential candidate Donald Trump called Acosta "a real beauty" for his reporting. Interrupting Acosta, who asked Trump about his ability to deal with scrutiny, Trump said: "Excuse me, excuse me, I've watched you on TV. You're a real beauty."

During President-elect Trump's first press conference on January 11, 2017, Acosta attempted to ask a question to the President-elect regarding Russia. Trump, however, instead called on other reporters, denouncing Acosta and CNN as "fake news".

Acosta got into a heated debate at a White House press conference on August 2, 2017, arguing with White House senior policy advisor Stephen Miller over the Trump administration's support for the RAISE Act. Politico said this interchange "cemented Acosta's undisputed role as the chief antagonist" for CNN against the Trump administration.

On August 2, 2018, shortly after Kaitlan Collins was banned from the official press conference by the White House and a statement of President Trump that "FAKE NEWS media... is the enemy of the American People", Acosta asked the press secretary of the White House Sarah Huckabee Sanders if she distances herself from that statement. She did not decline nor support that statement and argued over her own treatment by the media. Acosta was praised by many liberals and panned by many conservatives. This came in a wider context of critics by multiple entities (critic came by the United Nations and the Inter-American Commission on Human Rights, IACHR) for attacks by President Trump on the free press.

Access temporarily barred

Acosta verbally sparred with President Trump during a White House press conference on November 7, 2018, following the 2018 midterm elections. Trump said "You are a rude, terrible person. You shouldn't be working for CNN" after Acosta asked him a question about Trump's rhetoric regarding immigration and Trump's television advertisements which have been described as racist, and refused to give up the mic after his question was rebuffed.  According to the Press Secretary Sanders, Acosta put "his hands on a young woman just trying to do her job as a White House intern." Video of the incident showed Acosta had lowered his free arm to shield the roving microphone from being taken by the intern, saying, "Pardon me, ma'am," as he brushed her arm. Subsequently, Acosta's press pass, US Secret Service security credentials facilitating entry onto the White House grounds, was suspended "until further notice."

A CNN statement described Acosta's suspension as, "retaliation for his challenging questions". Sanders was accused of lying and of providing "fraudulent accusations and cited an incident that never happened."

The following day, the White House circulated a video which CNN said was doctored. The White House video matched a video posted by conspiracy theorist Paul Joseph Watson of the far-right website InfoWars, which had been subtly edited to portray the contact as approaching a physical blow. Social media intelligence agency Storyful said that, within the two-second long snippet of video that is repeated within the 15-seconds long overall clip, three frames are paused a fraction of a second, resulting in a slight time compression elsewhere than this highlighted footage showing brief contact of the intern's arm with Acosta's. Watson said he did not alter the clip, obtained from a GIF posted at The Daily Wire and that he republished as a compressed MP4 file after adding a zoomed-in replay.

In the days following the suspension, as CNN made behind-the-scenes efforts to restore Acosta's access and prepared a possible lawsuit toward this end as well, network news pieces quoted opinions of media law professor Jonathan Peters that "a journalist has a first amendment right of access to places closed to the public but open generally to the press [...which] can't be denied arbitrarily or absent compelling reasons" and of well-known free speech litigator Floyd Abrams, who said, "CNN might have reluctance to have a lawsuit titled 'CNN vs. Donald Trump.' That said, yes, I think they should sue."

Trump said Acosta's action as depicted "wasn't overly horrible". Concerning the clip, Trump said, "They gave a close-up view. That's not doctoring." Counselor to the President Kellyanne Conway described the clip as not altered but sped up, taking exception to what she believed the "overwrought description of this video as being doctored as if we put somebody else's arm in there."

Litigation

On November 13, 2018, CNN and Acosta, through counsel Ted Boutrous and Ted Olson of Gibson Dunn, filed civil suit in the U.S. District Court for the District of Columbia against Trump, White House Chief of Staff John Kelly, Deputy Chief of Staff/director of Communications Bill Shine, Press Secretary Sarah Huckabee Sanders, the U.S. Secret Service and its director, Randolph Alles, and an unnamed Secret Service agent, all in their official capacities. The filing also requested relief by way of an order temporarily restraining the White House from denying access to Acosta for journalistic purposes.

Amicus briefs were filed with the court in support of CNN's case, from journalistic entities whose editorial policies range across the political spectrum. The U.S. Department of Justice filed a brief arguing that First Amendment free speech rights do not "restrict the president's ability to determine the terms on which he does, or does not, engage with particular journalists."

The case was heard by Timothy Kelly, a Trump appointee to the District Court for the District of Columbia, who, on November 16, ordered Acosta's credentials restored for 14 days, owing to the court's belief that Acosta's due process rights likely had been violated, with the court's making no reference of the suit's arguments thus far concerning the First Amendment.

CNN eventually dropped the lawsuit on November 19 after the White House restored Acosta's press credentials with conditions.

Personal life
Acosta and his wife, Sharon Mobley Stow, a registered nurse, separated in 2017 after 17 years of marriage. They have a daughter and a son.

Books

References

External links

CNN Profile
Jim Acosta's Cuba Blog at CNN
 

1971 births
Living people
20th-century American journalists
21st-century American journalists
American male journalists
American people of Cuban descent
American people of Czech descent
American people of Irish descent
American television reporters and correspondents
Articles containing video clips
CNN people
James Madison University alumni
Journalists from New York City
Journalists from Virginia
People from Annandale, Virginia
Annandale High School alumni
American political journalists